Mount Toogood is a mountain (2,100 m; 6890 ft) at the south side of the head of Edwards Glacier in the Daniels Range, Usarp Mountains. Mapped by United States Geological Survey (USGS) from surveys and U.S. Navy air photos, 1960–63. Named by Advisory Committee on Antarctic Names (US-ACAN) for David J. Toogood, United States Antarctic Research Program (USARP) geologist at McMurdo Station, 1967–68 and 1968–69.

Mountains of Victoria Land
Pennell Coast